Oreomava cannfluviatilus is a species of small air-breathing land snail, a terrestrial pulmonate gastropod mollusk in the family Charopidae. This species is endemic to Australia.

References

Gastropods of Australia
Oreomava
Gastropods described in 1929
Taxonomy articles created by Polbot